Gustavo Santos is an Argentine politician. He was appointed minister of Tourism by Mauricio Macri. Since 2021, he has been a National Deputy elected in Córdoba for the Juntos por el Cambio coalition.

References

Ministers of Tourism of Argentina
Members of the Argentine Chamber of Deputies elected in Córdoba
Living people
People from Córdoba Province, Argentina
Year of birth missing (living people)